Sedeka is a surname. Notable people with the surname include:

Alex Sedeka, fictional lawyer in three David Kessler thriller novels
Dara Sedaka, American musician
Neil Sedaka, American singer

See also 
 Sedaka's Back, 1975 album
 Tzedakah